68P/Klemola or Klemola's Comet is a periodic comet, which belongs to Jupiter's comet family, that was discovered in 1965 by American astronomer  in Argentinian Yale-Columbia Southern Station.  Its orbital period is 10.82 years.

It was observed at the next predicted apparition by Gérard Sause at the Observatoire de Haute Provence, France on 6 August 1976 with a brightness of magnitude 12. It was successfully observed in 1987 when J. Gibson of the Palomar Observatory, California, obtained images with the 1.5-meter reflector on 16 February. It appeared essentially stellar, with a faint magnitude of 19. It was observed again on 29 March 1997 by Carl W. Hergenrother at the F. L. Whipple Observatory, with perihelion on 1 May 1998.

68P came to opposition on 14 June 2019 and perihelion on November 9, 2019.

See also
 List of numbered comets

References

External links
 Orbital simulation from JPL (Java) / Horizons Ephemeris
 68P/Klemola in Cometography

Periodic comets
0068
Astronomical objects discovered in 1965